Kahn-e Karim Bakhsh (also Romanized as Kahn-e Karīm Bakhsh; also known as Kahān-e Karīm Bakhsh) is a village in Birk Rural District, in the Central District of Mehrestan County, Sistan and Baluchestan Province, Iran. At the 2006 census, its population was 293, in 68 families.

References 

Populated places in Mehrestan County